Debra Lynn Waples (born July 30, 1953) is an American fencer. She was the captain of the USA fencing team and competed in the women's individual and team foil events at the 1984 Summer Olympics.

References

External links
 

1953 births
Living people
American female foil fencers
Olympic fencers of the United States
Fencers at the 1984 Summer Olympics
Sportspeople from Cincinnati
Pan American Games medalists in fencing
Pan American Games silver medalists for the United States
Pan American Games bronze medalists for the United States
Fencers at the 1979 Pan American Games
Fencers at the 1983 Pan American Games
21st-century American women